The Oneida Milling and Elevator Company Grain Elevator, in Power County, Idaho near American Falls, Idaho, was built in 1912.  It was listed on the National Register of Historic Places in 1993.

It is located offshore in the American Falls Reservoir, which covers the original townsite of American Falls.

It was built by the Flinton Construction Co.  It has also been known as the Colorado Milling and Elevator Company Grain Elevator.

References

Grain elevators
National Register of Historic Places in Power County, Idaho
Buildings and structures completed in 1912